Březno may refer to places in the Czech Republic:

Březno (Chomutov District), a municipality and village in the Ústí nad Labem Region
Březno (Mladá Boleslav District), a market town in the Central Bohemian Region
Březno, a village and part of Postoloprty in the Ústí nad Labem Region
Březno, a village and part of Velemín in the Ústí nad Labem Region
Krásné Březno, an administrative part of Ústí nad Labem in the Ústí nad Labem Region
Malé Březno (Most District), a municipality and village in the Ústí nad Labem Region
Malé Březno (Ústí nad Labem District), a municipality and village in the Ústí nad Labem Region
Velké Březno, a municipality and village in the Ústí nad Labem Region

See also
Brezno (disambiguation), Slovakia